Sydney University Cricket Club is a cricket club associated with the University of Sydney that plays predominately in the NSW Premier Cricket competition.  It was founded in 1864.

History
Teams representing the University of Sydney first played in the 1853-54 season. The club was founded in 1864 and joined the Sydney Grade Cricket competition in its inaugural season in 1893. Its first Grade Cricket match was against Glebe Cricket Club at Wentworth Park in 1893.

Records
The record for most runs in a 1st grade season for SUCC is held by G J Mail, with 1266 runs in the 2009-10 season.  The record for most wickets in a 1st grade season for SUCC is held by R J A Massie, with  69 wickets in the 1913-14 season.

Notable Players
Australian Test players who have played for Sydney University Cricket Club include Tom Garrett, Sammy Jones,  Johnny Taylor, John Dyson, Beau Casson, Greg Matthews, Stuart Clark, Stuart MacGill and Ed Cowan. Test players Imran Khan of Pakistan, William Sommerville of New Zealand and Kevin Pietersen of England have also played for the club. So does Phoebe Litchfield's brother.

Australia's first prime minister Edmund Barton played cricket for Sydney University Cricket Club.

In popular culture
The club has gained worldwide exposure due to its acronym, SUCC. This acronym is amusing to many involved in "meme culture", since the neologism "succ" has therein acquired an association with fellatio.

See also

References

Sydney Grade Cricket clubs
Cricket clubs established in 1864
1864 establishments in Australia
University and college sports clubs in Australia
Sport at the University of Sydney